is a Japanese politician of the Initiatives from Osaka party, a member of the House of Representatives in the Diet (national legislature). A native of Izumisano, Osaka and graduate of Waseda University, he joined Sankei Shimbun in 1997. He was elected to the House of Representatives for the first time in 2002 for the Liberal Democratic Party in a by-election. After losing his seat in 2003, he was re-elected in 2005.

References

External links 
  in Japanese.

|-

Members of the House of Representatives (Japan)
Waseda University alumni
People from Izumisano
Living people
1971 births
Liberal Democratic Party (Japan) politicians
Nippon Ishin no Kai politicians
21st-century Japanese politicians